Calophya is the type genus of the psyllid bug family Calophyidae.

Species 
 Calophya actinodaphne
 Calophya acutipennis
 Calophya andina
 Calophya angulipennis
 Calophya arcuata
 Calophya aurea
 Calophya brevicornis
 Calophya buchananiae
 Calophya californica
 Calophya catillicola
 Calophya chinensis
 Calophya clausa
 Calophya clavuligera
 Calophya dicksoni
 Calophya dubia
 Calophya duvauae
 Calophya elaeocarpae
 Calophya evodiae
 Calophya flavida
 Calophya floricola
 Calophya fusca
 Calophya gallifex
 Calophya hermicitae
 Calophya hyalina
 Calophya latiforceps
 Calophya ligustrae
 Calophya longispiculata
 Calophya luzonensis
 Calophya maculata
 Calophya mammifex
 Calophya mangiferae
 Calophya melanocephala
 Calophya meliorata
 Calophya minuta
 Calophya miramariensis
 Calophya monticola
 Calophya nigra
 Calophya nigrella
 Calophya nigricornis
 Calophya nigridorsalis
 Calophya nigrilineata
 Calophya nigripennis
 Calophya octimaculata
 Calophya orbicola
 Calophya oweni
 Calophya pallidula
 Calophya patagonica
 Calophya phaeosticta
 Calophya phellodendri
 Calophya rhicola
 Calophya rhois
 Calophya rhopenjabensis
 Calophya rotundipennis
 Calophya rubra
 Calophya schini
 Calophya scrobicola
 Calophya shinjii
 Calophya spondiasae
 Calophya stigmotacta
 Calophya terebinthifolii
 Calophya triangula
 Calophya triozomima
 Calophya venusta
 Calophya verrucosa
 Calophya verticis
 Calophya verticornis
 Calophya vertifuliginea
 Calophya washingtonia

 Calophya actinodaphne
 Calophya elaeocarpae
 Calophya ligustrae
 Calophya octimaculata
 Calophya phaeosticta
 Calophya rhopenjabensis
 Calophya vertifuliginea

References

External links 

Calophyidae
Psylloidea genera